Bayou Corne is an unincorporated community and census-designated place (CDP) in Assumption Parish, Louisiana, United States, along the bayou of the same name. The Bayou Corne sinkhole is less than one mile to the southeast.

Bayou Corne was first listed as a CDP in 2014.

Demographics

References 

Census-designated places in Assumption Parish, Louisiana
Census-designated places in Louisiana